Tomkins Mountain (variant names: Thomkins Knob, Thompkins Knob and Tompkins Knob) is a mountain in the North Carolina High Country, near the community of Deep Gap.  The majority of the mountain is within the Blue Ridge Parkway.  Its elevation reaches  and it also marks the corner between Ashe, Watauga, and Wilkes counties.

Split along the Eastern Continental Divide, it generates feeder streams to both the South Fork New River (via West Fork Pine Swamp Creek) and Yadkin River (via South Prong Lewis Fork).  Laurel Spur Ridge juts out south from the mountain; while Husons Ridge goes northwest, marking the Ashe/Watauga county line.

References

Mountains of North Carolina
Blue Ridge Parkway
Mountains of Ashe County, North Carolina
Mountains of Watauga County, North Carolina
Landforms of Wilkes County, North Carolina